[[
]]

Background 
The Miss Kentucky United States pageant is a preliminary for Miss United States. The pageant selects the representative who will compete for the title of Miss United States, generally held in Las Vegas. Miss United States Pageant is a part of the largest pageant system which allows kids and women 8+ to compete and give them a voice in this world. The founder of the pageant system that the Miss Kentucky United States pageant is in, is Isabella Ilacqua. She entered pageantry to give women power and to be recognized not only for their beauty but the qualities that make them winners. Because of the foundation Ilacqua layed, the United States Pageant is a top tier system.

Director 
The current director for Miss Kentucky United States is Katy Moody Cusick a former Miss Kentucky United States 2014. She is the only Kentucky representative to win Miss Congeniality at Miss United States. Cusick also placed third runner up to Elizabeth Safrit, who went on to represent the United States at Miss World.

Past winners

References 

Beauty pageants in the United States
History of women in Kentucky